Thyrsosalacia is a genus of flowering plants belonging to the family Celastraceae.

Its native range is Western Central Tropical Africa.

Species:
 Thyrsosalacia nematobrachion Loes. 
 Thyrsosalacia pararacemosa N.Hallé 
 Thyrsosalacia racemosa (Loes. ex Harms) N.Hallé 
 Thyrsosalacia viciifolia N.Hallé

References

Celastraceae
Celastrales genera